Abu'l-Makarim Muslim ibn Qirwash also known by the honorific title Sharaf al-Dawla, was the Uqaylid emir of Mosul and Aleppo. He died in June 1085.

History
Muslim's father Qirwash ibn Baraka, who was known by his honorific title Alam al-Din, was the Arab emir of Mosul who acknowledged the supremacy of the Seljuks, although he later came into conflict with them and was temporarily expelled from Mosul. He accompanied the Mamluk soldier Basasiri when the latter took Baghdad at the end of 1058, but the Seljuks retook the city in the next year. Qirwash died in 1061, and was followed by his son, Muslim ibn Qirwash.

As Muslim was a Shiite, he initially recognised the Caliph of Cairo but due to the growing power of the Seljuks accepted an alliance with Alp Arslan around the year 1066. His ties to the Seljuks were strengthened by a marriage to Safiyya, who was an aunt to the later Sultan Malik-Shah, but he seems to have explored anyways an alliance with the Fatimids. 

In 1077, he joined as Malik-Shah's vassal the sultan's brother emir Tutush I campaign to capture Aleppo during the reign of Sabiq ibn Mahmud of the Mirdasids. However, Muslim was personally fond of Sabiq, opposed a Seljuk takeover of Aleppo, and admonished the Kilabi chiefs for inviting Turkish foreigners against their kinsman. Moreover, he persuaded the Kilab to defect from Tutush's army and had Waththab and Shabib reconcile with and join their brother Sabiq in Aleppo. Muslim informed Tutush that he was withdrawing from the siege, but before departing he entered Aleppo through Bab al-Iraq where he allowed his troops to sell the residents of Aleppo food and supplies. Tutush maintained the siege and had called for reinforcements from Malik Shah I before Muslim's withdrawal. On his way back to Mosul, Muslim encountered the 1,000 Seljuk reinforcements at Sinjar. After failing to persuade them to turn back, he sent Sabiq warnings of their presence. Sabiq sent for help from the Kilabi chief Abu Za'ida Muhammad ibn Za'ida who led a coalition of Arab tribesmen to ambush and rout the Seljuk reinforcements at Wadi Butnan, slaying most of them. This prompted Tutush to leave Aleppo.

In 1080, Tutush influenced Sabiq to cede the emirate to Muslim ibn Qirwash, in which its inhabitants had hopes that he could protect them from Seljuk raids. He also took Harran from the Numayrids in the following year. Soon, however, he ran into trouble with the Seljuks himself. He fought against Sultan Malik Shah I's forces and was defeated, but he was pardoned. After Suleiman ibn Qutalmish had taken over Antioch in December 1084, Muslim demanded the tribute the Philaretos Brachamios used to pay him but Suleiman refused this on grounds of being a Muslim himself.
In June 1085, he was killed fighting the Seljuks of Suleiman ibn Qutalmish after his Turkoman mercenaries deserted him and sided with Suleiman and his Arab forces fled.

Following Sharaf al-Dawla's death, his brother Ibrahim ibn Qirwash, who had previously been imprisoned, was released and declared as his successor. Ibrahim would eventually be succeeded by his nephew, Ali ibn Muslim.

Legacy
Muslim ibn Qirwash was regarded as the last strong Arab prince in northern Syria, whose death resulted in the almost entire obliteration of the Arab Bedouins and the dominance of the Turcoman nomads.

Tomb 
The alleged tomb of Muslim ibn Qirwash was the Imam Dur Mausoleum in Samarra. However, the identity of the entombed is disputed. An inscription on the exterior states that the mausoleum is built in honour of Imam Muhammad al-Durri, an alleged son of the seventh Shia Imam, Musa al-Kadhim.

References

Bibliography

 

 

1085 deaths
11th-century Arabs
Uqaylid dynasty
Emirs of Mosul
Emirs of Aleppo
Iraqi Shia Muslims